Diana Prince is a fictional character appearing regularly in stories published by DC Comics, as the secret identity of the Amazonian superhero Wonder Woman, who bought the credentials and identity from a United States Army nurse named Diana Prince. The original Diana went to South America and married her fiancé to become Diana White. The character debuted in Sensation Comics #1 (January 1942) and was created by Charles Moulton and H. G. Peter.

The fictional career of Diana Prince evolved over the years, from the original Army nurse to becoming a military intelligence officer (promoted to higher ranks), then later a civilian employee, businesswoman, astronaut, or staff member at the United Nations, etc. In the TV series Wonder Woman she was a WAVES yeoman in the 1940s. Although originally possessing the powers of Wonder Woman at all times, Diana Prince later lost the powers when in her secret identity, and during the 1960s, Wonder Woman lost her powers and functioned only as a non-powered Diana Prince in other adventures.

Overview
Through the popularity of her Wonder Woman secret identity, the personality, concept, and name of Diana Prince have become ingrained in popular culture, becoming synonymous with secret identities and innocuous fronts for ulterior motives and activities.

First written in the earliest Wonder Woman comics, Diana Prince's role was multifaceted. Unlike the Superman secret identity of Clark Kent, who was originally little more than a front for Superman's activities, and who adopted a passive "mild-mannered" persona to conceal his underlying strength, Prince's identity functioned both to position Wonder Woman so that she could learn of situations requiring her intervention and to allow the character to embody feminist and other ideals espoused by Charles Moulton. For example, Diana Prince was originally a nurse and then an officer in military intelligence, starting in the typical woman's role of secretary but gradually earning more autonomy, including the authority to interrogate espionage suspects, eventually becoming an intelligence officer in her own right and, over the years, rising from Lieutenant to Major. Although Diana Prince was frequently told not to accompany Trevor at pivotal moments of adventures because it was "no place for a woman", Diana was actually the most competent person to tackle a crisis, whether by exercising her knowledge as Diana Prince or her power as Wonder Woman, riding with an all-girl cavalry of Etta Candy and the Beeta Lambda sorority. During the 1960s, Wonder Woman lost her powers and functioned exclusively as a non-powered Diana Prince who nonetheless experienced high adventure as a Modesty Blaise-type character.

Fictional character biography

Golden Age
Diana Prince was originally the name of a U.S. Army nurse during World War II who provided the primary alias for Princess Diana (Wonder Woman) of the Amazons. In January 1942, Princess Diana met Diana Prince, who was sobbing. When Wonder Woman asked her what was wrong, Prince explained that her fiancé, Dan White, was in South America and she lacked the funds to go to him. Noticing how similar they were in appearance, Wonder Woman gave Prince a large amount of money she had just earned from Al Kale's promotion of her bullets and bracelets routine; in exchange, Prince gave Wonder Woman her credentials and name. She later saved Steve from Axis forces.

When Steve Trevor had fully recovered from injuries sustained in his crash landing on Paradise Island and returned to duty at the Office of Strategic Services, Wonder Woman followed him, pursuing a job as secretary. Maj. Trevor already had a secretary of his own, Lila Brown, but Diana Prince successfully obtained a job as Col. Phil Darnell's secretary. Darnell noted that Diana, as an Army nurse, had the rank of 2nd Lieutenant. For a while, Lila was suspicious of Lt. Diana Prince, who did not seem to use any known system of shorthand when taking dictation (because Diana was actually relying on her own superior Amazon-trained eidetic memory) and did not seem to operate as a normal secretary would. Diana learned, to her dismay, that although she was now working alongside Steve Trevor, he only had eyes for Wonder Woman.

The real Diana Prince later returned, seeking out Wonder Woman. She asked for her identity back so that she could find work to help out her inventor husband Daniel White and their infant child. Wonder Woman agreed, and even impersonated her, so her husband would not know she was getting a job, but soon after, Nazi spies kidnapped Diana and planned to ransom her for one of her husband's inventions, an Anti-Aircraft Disintegrator Shell. Wonder Woman discovered the mastermind behind it was Dr Cue, a developer of diseases and gases. Wonder Woman was tied up and placed in an oven, but escaped after pretending to be knocked out by gas. Diana Prince was taken to where the shells were being tested and fell from the plane bound hand and foot while Cue used a parachute as the shell had disintegrated the plane. Wonder Woman rescued Diana and unmasked Cue, revealing him as Colonel Togo Ku, Chief of Japanese spies in America. Wonder Woman rescued Dan White and apprehended the spies. When the invention proved successful, Diana Prince relinquished her legal name and began referring to herself by her married name Diana White, and Wonder Woman resumed using the Diana Prince identity.

Diana Prince continued to work in military intelligence, eventually rising to the rank of Major. She was forced later into the difficult situation of working alongside her true love, Steve Trevor, while Darnell fell for Diana Prince.

When the DC Universe adopted the convention that the Golden Age adventures took place on the parallel world of Earth-Two, it was learned that Wonder Woman eventually gave up her secret identity, married Steve Trevor, and became the mother of Hippolyta "Lyta" Trevor, who became the superheroine Fury. Although she had given up her immortality by marrying Trevor, this Wonder Woman was still aging at a much slower rate than her husband and sometimes met the Earth-1 Wonder Woman.

Golden Age redux
When the Wonder Woman television series debuted, with its first season set in World War II, the comics followed suit, shifting adventures back to that time. Although the DCU multiverse conventions had been set, the parallel world in which the comic adventures took place deviated significantly from the Golden Age stories that had been retroactively set on Earth-Two, following instead the setting of the TV show. The Diana Prince identity, notably, was not an Army nurse-lieutenant but, instead, a WAVES yeoman, who was secretary for Maj. Trevor and not the commanding officer (Gen. Blankenship, replacing Col. Darnell).

Silver and Bronze Ages
Later retellings of the origins of Wonder Woman, of dubious continuity for the Earth-One Wonder Woman, excluded the story of Wonder Woman purchasing credentials from a real Diana Prince and, instead, showed her creating the identity from scratch. In some versions, the Diana Prince identity was created to become a military intelligence officer, winning the opportunity after competing against several women in a contest of skills, but in others Diana Prince was first a nurse who then followed Steve to military intelligence. In one version, the identity just appears without explanation.

Diana Prince, the New Wonder Woman

The change coincided with the switch from longtime editor Robert Kanigher (who had taken over writing for the character following the death of creator William Moulton Marston in 1947), to new editor Dennis O'Neil in Wonder Woman #178 (dated October 1968). According to the new writer/artist Mike Sekowsky, the reason for the change was: "[T]he sales on the old WW were so bad that the book was going to be dropped. The new Wonder Woman was given a chance -- (a last chance for the book) and it worked!" Diana Prince gave herself a "mod" makeover in order to go undercover when Trevor was accused of being a double-agent. The following issue, the Amazons claimed they needed to leave this world for another dimension in order to "renew their magic", and Diana renounced her powers and Wonder Woman identity in order to remain with Steve. Meanwhile, Steve Trevor was kidnapped by the evil Doctor Cyber, international terrorist. During this adventure, Diana Prince met and befriended blind martial arts expert I Ching, who trained her in Asian martial arts, which Diana as a trained Amazon quickly mastered. When one of Cyber's henchwomen killed Trevor (in issue 180), Diana transitioned into working with Ching to bring down Cyber. Other adventures included sword-and-sorcery missions, supernatural villains, fighting militia sects, and helping people in trouble.

Diana left the military, opening a "mod" boutique in New York City. After rescuing runaway Cathy Perkins, who had been captured by a weird dominatrix gang, she hired Cathy to be her assistant and run the boutique when Diana was called away for adventures. One such adventure saw her being forced back into military service for one case.

The non-powered Diana Prince era ended as abruptly as it had started when Kanigher returned as editor in Wonder Woman #204 (dated February 1973). A sniper terrorized New York City. He shot and killed a motorist, whose car crashed into a restaurant in which Diana and Ching were enjoying lunch. Ching was killed, and an enraged Diana set off to stop the sniper. Along the way, she suffered a head injury, and the dazed Diana started operating on subconscious urges that compelled her to steal a military aircraft and head for the Bermuda Triangle, where she crashed. When she woke up, she was suffering from amnesia, and she found herself on Paradise Island, where the Amazons restored as many of her memories as possible, although her time as a non-powered adventurer could not be restored completely. The restoration of the superpowered Wonder Woman was inspired, at least in part, by complaints from feminist advocate Gloria Steinem about the de-powering of the character.

Modernizing the classic concepts
Wonder Woman returned to man's world, adopting the Diana Prince identity again and finding work at the United Nations, first as a translator and guide and then as an agent for the UN Crisis Bureau, under Morgan Tracy. When Steve Trevor was restored to life mystically (later revealed to be the infusion of the hardy life force of Eros, the love god), he found work at the UN-related Spy-on-Spy service under the alias Steve Howard. Steve and Diana lived and worked together until Steve was kidnapped and slain by a man obsessed with reviving a demon.

In Wonder Woman #250, Diana lost the title of Wonder Woman to an amazon rival named Orana. In spite of her loss, Diana rebelled against the Gods of Olympus and left Paradise Island determined to live her life in her alter ego.  However her super heroine retirement was short lived.  In the following issue, Wonder Woman #251, Orana, called herself the "New Wonder Woman" and tried to pick up Diana's responsibilities as a heroine. In Orana's first major battle, the red-haired Wonder Woman was shot and killed by a terrorist named Warhead. Orana's death allowed Diana to reclaim her role as Wonder Woman once again.  Diana eventually left the UN Crisis Bureau and briefly served as a NASA astronaut in Houston, where she dated fellow astronaut Mike Bailey (later revealed to be operating as Ace of the Royal Flush Gang,) before returning to a different UN program.

Still grieving the second death of Steve Trevor, Diana returned to Paradise Island, where her memories of Steve Trevor were erased in a misguided attempt to heal her emotional distress. When a Steve Trevor from a parallel world crashlanded off Paradise Island, Aphrodite altered the memories of all the world to allow him to be accepted as the Steve Trevor of this world. Wonder Woman erased all traces of her previous life as Diana Prince and established a new Diana Prince identity, becoming an Air Force captain, (eventually major), serving in the Pentagon as adjutant to Col. Trevor in the Special Assignments Bureau, a special military intelligence program designed to interdict global crises before they develop.

For a while, Diana found herself torn between Steve and Maj. Keith Griggs, who was in love with Diana Prince.

This Diana Prince identity was ended during the Crisis on Infinite Earths, when an office meeting was interrupted by Hermes, demanding Diana's service to save Paradise Island and Olympus itself. Diana and Steve were married by Zeus himself, before all of history was rewritten by the events of the Crisis on Infinite Earths.

Post-Crisis
 After the Crisis on Infinite Earths storyline, the history of all DC Comics' characters were erased and restarted anew. When the Wonder Woman comic book was rebooted "Post-Crisis", the Diana Prince identity was not revived, although references to it were occasionally made as a possible name to use for legal purposes. Instead Wonder Woman was simply referred to as "Diana of Themyscira" when not in costume. Thus, she had no secret identity and lived openly as an Amazon in everyday life. There were a few times where Wonder Woman did adopt a secret identity but only for undercover operations, such as when she worked beside the assassin Deathstroke. During that adventure in the Balkan country of Pan Balgravia Diana created the false persona of Diane Prince to hide herself from the country's government spies while trying to rescue an abducted Barbara Minerva. Later when Diana worked at the Gateway City Museum with Helena Sandsmark she did publicly use her well-known alias during an on-camera interview with a reporter.

When Hippolyta assumed the role of Wonder Woman and traveled back to World War II, she stayed in the home of a Nurse Diana Prince.

in 2005, during the Infinite Crisis storyline, Diana as Wonder Woman was forced to kill an unarmed civilian for the first time ever when deranged businessman/spymaster Maxwell Lord murdered Ted Kord (Blue Beetle II) and seized mental control of Superman, forcing him to brutally attack Batman. Under the influence of her lasso, Lord told her that the only way to stop him was to kill him; seeing no other alternative, she snapped his neck. The Brother Eye sentient computer satellite transmitted live video of Diana killing Lord to screens all over the world, destroying her reputation and even turning Superman and Batman against her. In the wake of the global hostility this act caused toward her, the Amazon went into a year's exile. This exile ended the viability of her initially intended mission of being an ambassador and teacher of Amazon principles. Once she returned to public life, Diana realized that her life as a full-time celebrity superhero and ambassador had kept her removed from humanity. Because of this she again donned the persona of Diana Prince and became an agent at the Department of Metahuman Affairs, where she was ordered to help capture Wonder Woman. During a later battle with Circe, the witch placed a spell on Diana leaving Wonder Woman powerless when in the role of Diana Prince.

In other media

The Diana Prince identity has been a feature of almost all significant appearances of Wonder Woman in other media.

The first effort at a pilot presentation for a television series was based on a comedic conceit that the homely Diana Prince saw herself as a gorgeous Amazon whenever she becomes Wonder Woman—although no one else sees such a change in her looks.

The first TV pilot movie, starring Cathy Lee Crosby, was modeled primarily on the mod Diana Prince era and featured Crosby as Diana Prince, secretary to Office of Strategic Services (O.S.S) Major Steve Trevor, but secretly operating on her own as an agent known to some as "Wonder Woman".

The Super Friends animated series included at least one episode featuring Diana Prince spinning to become Wonder Woman.

The most significant appearance to date has been the Wonder Woman television series, starring Lynda Carter. Diana Prince was in the first season the bespectacled Yeoman Prince, WAVES secretary to Maj. Steve Trevor in the O.S.S. headquarters in Washington, DC. In the second and third seasons, set in the modern day, Diana Prince was an agent of the Inter-Agency Defense Command (IADC), operating at first from Washington and, in the final episode, from the Los Angeles field office.

The Lynda Carter TV series had a significant impact on the comic book. During the first season, DC Comics decided to set the comic book in World War II to match the series, using the parallel worlds conceit to explain that the Wonder Woman of Earth-One accidentally travelled both back in time and to a parallel world, where she encountered her multiversal counterpart. When the Earth-One Wonder Woman returned to the present day, the comic book remained behind in World War II to follow the adventures of that Wonder Woman. This experiment lasted a year, until the May 1978 issue returned to the present day. Once the comic returned to the present day, the comic art by José Delbo continued to reflect aspects of the TV series, notably the fashion-forward Diana Prince with a long ponytail, but mostly without the Clark Kent-esque glasses which became a feature of the TV series starting in the middle of the second season. From that point on, Diana would wear her glasses if she is either in her office or driving a car. Other aspects of the TV series, most notably the "Wonder spin" transformation and the convention that Diana Prince is powerless until she transforms into Wonder Woman, became incorporated in the 2005 restart of the comic book.

This character is portrayed by Gal Gadot in the 2016 film Batman v Superman: Dawn of Justice. It marks the first theatrical appearance of Diana as well as the first live action theatrical appearance of her Amazonian superhero counterpart, with a new image. She later received her own film in 2017, which depicts the Diana Prince identity as a curator of antiquities at the Louvre Museum in Paris. The name is referenced in the film as Steve Trevor forms it to cut off Diana from fully saying "Diana, Princess of Themyscira" in an effort to form a secret identity for her. This character also appears in Wonder Woman 1984 and most recently in Zack Snyder's Justice League. 

Comic books based on the Super Friends cartoon continuity had the original Diana Prince and her husband Dan White as the parents of original kid sidekick Marvin, with his connection being the reason he was considered for the role. This was never brought up in the cartoon. His partner Wendy was the niece of one of Batman's earliest mentors as well.

Secret identity transformation
In the Golden Age, Diana eventually learned the benefits of keeping her Wonder Woman costume under her military uniform, instead of leaving it at her apartment or in a desk drawer. Her transformation often involved her running out of a room, changing clothes at superspeed, and returning to a room as Wonder Woman. Occasionally, panels would show her in mid-transformation, pulling off stockings and revealing her Wonder Woman costume under the uniform.

A Bronze Age tweak gave her a new method of transformation using the magic lasso. The explanation was that Amazon scientists treated Wonder Woman's clothes with a special chemical that would respond to the vibrations of the magic lasso; whenever Diana stepped into the lasso loop and brought it up and down, her Diana Prince clothes would transform into the Wonder Woman armor.

The best known transformation sequence was created by Lynda Carter in behind-the-scenes decisions for the Wonder Woman television show: a twirling transformation, which was based on a dance maneuver. As the twirl was refined, it involved Diana Prince stretching her arms out and making a counter-clockwise quarter turn and then a series of clockwise turns, with a mystical explosion of light, leaving her as Wonder Woman. Eventually, it was revealed that Diana Prince was powerless, until she executed the twirl and became Wonder Woman. A couple of episodes would have Diana Prince attempting the twirl, only to be interrupted by muggers or having to stop the process due to fear of exposing her secret identity; in which she would not have turned herself into Wonder Woman, implying the process must be completed for her to do so. Also implied is that the process must be precise; the less experienced Wonder Girl attempted the twirl only to find herself still an ordinary woman. Only when she thought back to her training in a flashback with Hippolyta did she realize she must mentally focus and think of the transformation while twirling with ballet-like grace to be effective.

The twirl was featured infrequently on Super Friends, whenever Diana Prince needed to leave her civilian job and attend to the various crises which she and JLA teammates faced throughout the show.

The "Wonder twirl" was copied briefly into the pre-Crisis comics during the period in which the comic book returned to World War II in order to correspond with the first season of the TV series, but Wonder Woman never lost her strength as Diana Prince. The twirl returned a few times in the post-Crisis comic book, before the post-Infinite Crisis reboot of the series, which brought the twirl back as a primary feature, along with the TV show convention that Wonder Woman loses her powers in the Diana Prince identity.

The "Wonder twirl" was also shown in the "To Another Shore" episode of Justice League Unlimited and in a scene of Reign of the Supermen.

Diana as successful businesswoman

In 2011, David E. Kelley wrote a Wonder Woman pilot for NBC that was never picked up to be on the air. The story takes place in modern-day Los Angeles, and the character, played by Adrianne Palicki, would have three identities: Wonder Woman (a superhero who fights crime), Diana Themyscira (Wonder Woman's public persona outside of costume, who is a successful businesswoman and owner of Themyscira Industries) and Diana Prince (an ordinary shy woman, the other assistant of Diana Themyscira).  The Diana Prince identity would have been used to allow Diana some escape from her more recognized role as Diana Themyscira and Wonder Woman.

See also
 List of Wonder Woman enemies
 List of Wonder Woman supporting characters

References

External links
 YouTube video clip of spinning transformation from season one of TV series

DC Comics Amazons
DC Comics female superheroes
DC Comics hybrids
DC Comics characters who can move at superhuman speeds
DC Comics characters with superhuman strength
DC Comics characters with accelerated healing
DC Comics martial artists
Wonder Woman characters
Fictional antiquarians and curators
Fictional bisexual females
Fictional female businesspeople
Fictional civil servants
Fictional demigods
Fictional female military personnel
Fictional people in fashion
Fictional medical personnel
Fictional NASA astronauts
Fictional nurses
Fictional secret agents and spies in comics
Fictional secretaries
Fictional shopkeepers
Fictional United States Army personnel
Fictional United Nations personnel
Fictional World War II veterans
Fictional World War I veterans
Superheroes with alter egos
Characters created by William Moulton Marston
Comics characters introduced in 1942
Characters created by H. G. Peter
Female characters in comics
WAVES (Navy)
Vigilante characters in comics
Fictional characters with eidetic memory